The 1938 Michigan State Spartans football team represented Michigan State College as an independent during the 1938 college football season. In their sixth season under head coach Charlie Bachman, the Spartans compiled a 6–3 record and lost their annual rivalry game with Michigan by a 14 to 0 score. In inter-sectional play, the team defeated West Virginia (26–0), Syracuse (19–12), and Temple (10–0), and lost to Santa Clara (7–6).

Halfback John Pingel was selected by the Associated Press (AP), International News Service (INS) and Detroit Times as a first-team player, on the 1938 College Football All-America Team. Pingel was later inducted into the College Football Hall of Fame.

Schedule

Game summaries

Michigan

On October 1, 1938, the Spartans lost to Michigan by a 14 to 0 score. The game, the 33rd between the two programs, was played at Michigan Stadium before 82,500 spectators. Sophomore halfback Paul Kromer, appearing in his first game for the Wolverines, scored both touchdowns.  Michigan's first points were scored after Fred Trosko intercepted a John Pingel pass at the end of the first quarter, giving Michigan possession at the Spartans' 47-yard line. Kromer scored the touchdown on fourth down from the two-yard line.  Michigan's second touchdown was also set up by an interception, with Norm Purucker intercepting a Pingel pass. Kromer again scored on a two-yard run.

References

Michigan State
Michigan State Spartans football seasons
Michigan State Spartans football